Fish Out of Water is an album by jazz saxophonist Charles Lloyd recorded by Lloyd with Bobo Stenson, Palle Danielsson and Jon Christensen.

Reception
The AllMusic review by David R. Adler stated: "While some may find the disc a bit too placid overall, there's much to be said for Lloyd's unruffled, effortlessly bluesy playing".

Track listing
All compositions by Charles Lloyd

 "Fish Out of Water" - 9:24
 "Haghia Sophia" - 7:29
 "The Dirge" - 10:14
 "Bharati" - 8:28
 "Eyes of Love" - 8:36
 "Mirror" - 9:34
 "Tellaro" - 4:02 Bonus track on CD reissue

Personnel
Charles Lloyd - tenor saxophone, flute
Bobo Stenson - piano
Palle Danielsson - double bass
Jon Christensen - drums

References

1990 albums
ECM Records albums
Charles Lloyd (jazz musician) albums
Albums produced by Manfred Eicher